Montacuto is a comune (municipality) in the Province of Alessandria in the Italian region Piedmont, located about  southeast of Turin and about  southeast of Alessandria.

Montacuto borders the following municipalities: Albera Ligure, Cantalupo Ligure, Dernice, Fabbrica Curone, Gremiasco, and San Sebastiano Curone.

References

Cities and towns in Piedmont